The Aja language is a Gbe language spoken by the Aja people of Benin, Togo, Ghana, Nigeria and Gabon.
In Gabon, they are mostly migrants.

it is closely related to other  Gbe languages such as Ewe, Mina, Fon, and Phla Phera.

Phonology

Consonants 

 Voiced consonants /, / are heard as nasal sonorant sounds [, ] when followed by a nasal vowel.
 // is heard as a rhotic trill [] when after alveolar, retroflex or post-alveolar consonants.
 Sounds // and // are heard as post-alveolar [], [] when preceding //.
 Approximant sounds /, / may also be nasalized as [, ] when preceding or following nasal vowels.
 Some linguists have also attested the nasal sound [], and labialized uvular sounds, [] and [], as separate phonemes.

Vowels 

 // when before // is heard as a labio-palatal []. It is then nasalized as [] when in nasal position.

Comparison

Article 1 of the Universal Declaration of Human Rights

Aja

Ewe

English
All human beings are born free and equal in dignity and rights. They are endowed with reason and conscience and should act towards one another in a spirit of brotherhood.

References

Gbe languages
Languages of Benin
Languages of Togo